Mark Kingston (18 April 1934 – 9 October 2011) was an English actor who made many television and stage appearances over his 50-year career.

Biography 
Kingston's father was a blacksmith and he attended Greenwich Central School and trained as an actor at LAMDA, he then appeared in repertory theatre and at the Old Vic with Vivien Leigh.

He played the lecturer Frank in the original stage production of Educating Rita with Julie Walters. On television he had significant roles in Beryl's Lot, A Voyage Round My Father, Shine on Harvey Moon, and other productions. His film career included roles in Invasion (1965), Love Is a Splendid Illusion (1970), Hitler: The Last Ten Days (1973) as Martin Bormann, Saint Jack (1979), Lady Oscar (1979), Sphinx (1981) and Give My Regards to Broad Street (1984). Kingston also appeared in an episode of Birds of a Feather as Sharon's (Pauline Quirke) Lover (1990).

He died at Denville Hall retirement village in 2011.

Partial filmography
Women Without Men (1956) - Operator (uncredited)
Invasion (1966) - Private Morgan
Love Is a Splendid Illusion (1970) - Bernard Collins
Hitler: The Last Ten Days (1973) - Martin Bormann
Lady Oscar (1979) - Général de Jarjayes
Saint Jack (1979) - Yates
Sphinx (1981) - Carter
Give My Regards to Broad Street (1984) - Terry
The Case of the Missing Will (Poirot TV Series) (1993) - Andrew Marsh

References

External links

1934 births
2011 deaths
Alumni of the London Academy of Music and Dramatic Art
English male stage actors
English male television actors